is a Japanese snowboarder who competes in the slopestyle event.

Born in Miki, Hyōgo, Japan, he competed for Japan at the 2014 Winter Olympics in Sochi, qualifying for the final of the slopestyle event and finishing 8th overall.

Kadono won the Nokia Air and Style in Beijing in 2012, at the age of 16, making him one of the youngest to win the event besides Shaun White. He was the 2012–13 overall World Cup Champion in the slopestyle event.

Kadono placed 3rd in Big Air at the 2015 X Games in Aspen and first at the 2016 X games in Oslo. He won the 2015 Burton US Open Slopestyle with the first ever Back-To-Back Triple Cork 1620s.

Despite being considered a medal contender by observers including Tyler Nicholson and Transworld Snowboarding, Kadono was not selected for the 2018 Winter Olympics, with reports indicating that this was due to a code of conduct violation.

In 2020, he won his second Burton US Open Slopestyle victory.

References

External links
 
 Yuki Kadono at World Snowboarding
 
 
 
 

1996 births
Japanese male snowboarders
Living people
Olympic snowboarders of Japan
Snowboarders at the 2014 Winter Olympics
People from Miki, Hyōgo
Sportspeople from Hyōgo Prefecture
X Games athletes
21st-century Japanese people